Valentyna Ivakhnenko and Kateryna Kozlova were the defending champions, but they chose to participate in Donetsk.

Yuliya Beygelzimer and Renata Voráčová won the title defeating Tereza Mrdeža and Silvia Njirić in the final 6–1, 6–1.

Seeds

Draw

Draw

References
 Main Draw

Open 88 Contrexeville - Doubles